"Salma Ya Salama" is an Egyptian Folk song by Dalida from 1976. The track became one of the singer's biggest hits and over the years has sold 4 million units on disc. 

It was among the first Ethnic fusion hits in the world, recorded in five languages (Egyptian Arabic, French, German, and Italian: "Uomo di sabbia" and Spanish). The French version speaks of a man wandering in the desert and sees a mirage of a garden paradise.

Release and reception 
First recorded in Arabic for audiences in the Middle East, it achieved big success upon its release thus it was translated to French and released in France in 1977. Both versions are featured on eponymous album by Dalida released the same year, which contains several other hits.

The 45 rpm single was released in two different pressings - The French version (IS 45730) coupled with "Ti amo"  (originally by Umberto Tozzi) and the Egyptian version (IS 45731) coupled with the instrumental version. The disc was distributed by "Sonopresse". When Dalida signed with "Carrere" in 1978, a third 45 rpm pressing (CA 49354) was made.

The song was then translated into Italian and German.

Dalida remixes
In 1995, Orlando (brother of Dalida, producer and French record label owner) released two completely re-orchestrated versions of the "Salma Ya Salama" in its album release Comme si j'étais là... one in French and the other in an Egyptian version (both offered as a bonus).

The song was remixed again in late 1996 for the Dalida album L'an 2005 and as a CD single. This version, released in May 1997, was certified silver having reached the French Top 20 chart. A clip was made for the occasion.

Charts

Other versions
The song "Salma Ya Salama" has been performed by other artists, such as Haifa Wehbe, Alabina, Chantal Chamandy, Jean Michel Jarre, Giota Lydia, Ziynet Sali, Krum & Miro, Mika, WAMA and Tiziana Rivale. It was also sung by Atilla Taş as "Sallana Sallana" at his debut album, "Kırmızılım" ("My red" in Turkish) in 1998.
A version of it has also been performed by the Greek singer Marinella with the name Pali Berdeftika.

Appearances
The song is used in the soundtrack of 1996 French film Pédale douce directed by Gabriel Aghion.

References

External links
 Dalida official website "Discography" section

Dalida songs
Egyptian songs
Egyptian patriotic songs
Songs about nostalgia
Songs in Egyptian dialect (Masry) of Arabic